The Institut catholique d’études supérieures (in English, Catholic Institute of Higher Studies), also called “Catholic University of Vendée”, founded in 1989, is a small private university located in Vendée department of western France. ICES has utilized the concept in higher education, introduced by its first Director, Hervé Grollier, of the “University School”: a blend of the French Grandes écoles and the traditional state university.

In 1990, under the authority of the Catholic University of the West, the Catholic University of the Vendée (ICES) was opened in La Roche-sur-Yon. After three years of collaboration, the Superior Council of the Catholic University of the West awarded the Catholic University of the Vendée (ICES) its academic independence in 1993. François Garnier, Bishop of Luçon, became the institutional head of the establishment with the responsibility of maintaining its ecclesiastical membership.

ICES has a main building, designed by the French architect Denis Laming, that was built between 1990 and 1994. The University Library was completed in 1997.  A student residence was established in the abandoned convent of the Sisters of the Christian Schools of Mercy in 2000.

In France, diplomas in broad subject areas such as Biology, Law, History, Languages, etc. are mostly proposed in state-run universities. ICES proposes state diplomas in broad study areas with pedagogical and educational standards that resemble those of elite Grandes écoles. ICES’ 1150 students follow classes, conferences and symposia given by nationally and internationally renowned professors from France and abroad.

Controversy 
In May 2019, students from the university were part of a group of young people who carried out an attack on a Vendee LGBT Centre stand in La Roche-sur-Yonon on the International Day Against Homophobia, Transphobia and Biphobia. 

The university's president Eric de Labarre condemned the attack: "We are poisoned by this minority [which is] radicalized, very politicized".

See also 
:Category:Academic staff of the Institut catholique d'études supérieures

References

External links 

Educational institutions established in 1990
Catholic universities and colleges in France
1990 establishments in France